is a station on the Kanazawa Seaside Line, located in Kanazawa-ku, Yokohama, Japan. It opened on 5 July 1989.

Station Layout
This elevated station consists of two island platforms serving three tracks. The center track is not used in regular service.

Adjacent stations

Railway stations in Kanagawa Prefecture
Kanazawa Seaside Line
Railway stations in Japan opened in 1989